The island least gecko (Sphaerodactylus sputator) is a species of gecko endemic to the Lesser Antilles in the Caribbean.

Geographic range
S. sputator can be found on Anguilla (and some of its satellites), Saint Martin, Saint Barthélemy, Saint Kitts, Nevis, and Sint Eustatius.

Description
Populations of S. sputator on Anguilla have a pale pink dorsal surface, with between five and eight pale crossbands on the back.  The throat is pale yellow, and the ventral surface is light cream-colored.  It has a gold iris, with a yellow canthal line.

On Saint Martin, it has a tan dorsal color, with a pearl-colored ventral surface.  The tail is pale yellow to orange, and the iris is bronze-colored.

References

Further reading
Boulenger GA (1885). Catalogue of the Lizards in the British Museum (Natural History). Second Edition. Volume I. Geckonidæ ... London: Trustees of the British Museum (Natural History). (Taylor and Francis, printers). xii + 436 pp. + Plates I-XXXII. (Sphærodactylus sputator, pp. 219–220).
Malhotra, Anita; Thorpe, Roger S. (1999). Reptiles & Amphibians of the Eastern Caribbean. Oxford, England: Macmillan Education Ltd. 144 pp. . (pp. 53, 55–56, 58, 60, 65, 66).
Schwartz A, Thomas R (1975). A Check-list of West Indian Amphibians and Reptiles. Carnegie Museum of Natural History Special Publication No. 1. Pittsburgh, Pennsylvania: Carnegie Museum of Natural History. 216 pp. (Sphaerodactylus sputator, p. 162).
Sparrman A (1784). "Lacerta sputator und Lacerta bimaculata, zwey neue Eideren aus Amerika ". Königlich-Schwedischen Akademie der Wissenschaften Neue Abhandlungen aus der Naturlehre Haushaltungkunst und Mechanik 3 (1): 166-169 + Plate IV. (Lacerta sputator, new species, p. 169 + Plate IV, figures 1–3). (in German and Latin).

External links

Sphaerodactylus sputator at the Encyclopedia of Life
Sphaerodactylus sputator at the Reptile Database

Sphaerodactylus
Lizards of the Caribbean
Reptiles described in 1784